Vernon Kurtz is a prominent conservative rabbi who has led North Suburban Synagogue Beth El for 30 years.  He was also the president of the American Zionist Movement until 2017.

References

Rabbis from Illinois
Living people
Date of birth missing (living people)
Year of birth missing (living people)
21st-century American Jews